Nu-Mixx Klazzics Vol. 2 – Evolution: Duets & Remixes is a posthumously released remix album by American rapper Tupac Shakur. The album was released through Koch. It is the follow-up to Tupac Shakur's Nu-Mixx Klazzics, released previously on October 7, 2003. Its original title was Evolution: Duets & Remixes, and was released on  August 14, 2007.

This release contains mostly remixes of recordings from two of his biggest selling albums, All Eyez on Me and The Don Killuminati: The 7 Day Theory. Hip-hop producer and rapper Daz Dillinger, Sha Money XL, and Street Radio were part of the record production. The album debuted at #45 on the Billboard 200 with nearly 15,000 sales on its first week on the charts.

Track listing

Chart history 
Album

References

External links 
 2Pac Legacy (official website)
 WIDEawake Death Row Records LLC (producer of the album)
 Tupac Amaru Shakur Foundation for the Arts

Albums produced by E.D.I.
Albums produced by Jake One
Remix albums published posthumously
2007 remix albums
Tupac Shakur remix albums
Death Row Records remix albums
Gangsta rap remix albums